Cyclina sinensis, commonly known as Chinese venus, black clam, iron clam, and Korean cyclina clam, is a clam species in the venus clam family, Veneridae. It mostly lives in the flats on the coast of seas in East Asia, such as the Yellow Sea and the West sea.

References

Bivalves of Asia
Korean seafood
Bivalves described in 1791
Taxa named by Johann Friedrich Gmelin
Molluscs of the Pacific Ocean
Veneridae